Nanyang is the romanization of two common Chinese place names. It may refer to:

Written as 南洋 (Southern Ocean)
 Nanyang (region), a Chinese term denoting the Southeast Asian lands surrounding the South China Sea

China
 Nanyang Fleet, Qing dynasty naval fleet based in Shanghai
 Shanghai Jiao Tong University, originally Nanyang Public School
 Nanyang Model High School, or Nanyang Middle School, Shanghai
 Nanyang, Yancheng, a town in Tinghu District, Yancheng, Jiangsu

Malaysia
 Nanyang Siang Pau, a Chinese language newspaper

Singapore
 Nanyang, Singapore, a residential precinct
 Nanyang Academy of Fine Arts
 Nanyang Girls' High School
 Nanyang Junior College
 Nanyang Polytechnic
 Nanyang Primary School
 Nanyang Technological University
 Hwa Chong Institution, formerly Nanyang Overseas Chinese High School

Written as 南陽/南阳 (Southern Yang, as in "yin and yang")
 Nanyang, Henan, a prefecture-level city
 Nanyang Basin, Henan
 Nanyang Commandery, a historical region centered in Nanyang City
 Nanyang Lake, one of the Nansi Lakes in Southwestern Shandong

Towns in China
 Nanyang, Shanghang County, Fujian
 Nanyang, Shouning County, Fujian
 Nanyang, Tanchang County, in Tanchang County, Gansu
 Nanyang, Nanning, in Qingxiu District, Nanning, Guangxi
 Nanyang, Xingshan County, in Xingshan County, Hubei
 Nanyang, Leiyang, in Leiyang City, Hunan
 Nanyang, Dafeng, in Dafeng City, Jiangsu
 Nanyang, Qidong, in Qidong City, Jiangsu
 Nanyang, Fufeng County, in Fufeng County, Shaanxi
 Nanyang, Weishan County, in Weishan County, Shandong
 Nanyang, Hangzhou, in Xiaoshan District, Hangzhou, Zhejiang